Onychosepalum is a plant genus in the family Restionaceae, described as a genus in 1855.

The entire genus is endemic to the State of Western Australia.

 Species
 Onychosepalum laxiflorum Steud.
 Onychosepalum microcarpum Meney & Pate
 Onychosepalum nodatum B.G.Briggs & L.A.S.Johnson

References

Restionaceae
Poales genera
Endemic flora of Australia